Podróże is a monthly Polish magazine published in Warsaw since 1998. The magazine presents travel tips and geographical information. It is one of the largest travel magazines in Poland.

History and profile
Podróże was launched in 1998. The publisher of the magazine is TIME SA, a Polish media group. The company is part of Grupa ZPR Media. It was first published on a bimonthly basis and then, on a monthly basis. The headquarters of the magazine is in Warsaw. Filip Niedenthal is one of the former editors-in-chief of the magazine, who served in the post between 2008 and 2012.

In December 2017, Podróże had an average circulation of 19,600 copies.

References

External links

1998 establishments in Poland
Bi-monthly magazines
Geographic magazines
Magazines established in 1998
Magazines published in Warsaw
Monthly magazines published in Poland
Polish-language magazines
Tourism magazines